Rhabdorrhynchus is a genus of weevil found in Central Europe. It includes five known species.

References 

Lixinae
Beetles of Europe